Rationing was introduced temporarily by the British government several times during the 20th century, during and immediately after a war.

At the start of the Second World War in 1939, the United Kingdom was importing 20 million long tons of food per year, including about 70% of its cheese and sugar, almost 80% of fruit and about 70% of cereals and fats. The UK also imported more than half of its meat and relied on imported feed to support its domestic meat production. The civilian population of the country was about 50 million. It was one of the principal strategies of the Germans in the Battle of the Atlantic to attack shipping bound for Britain, restricting British industry and potentially starving the nation into submission.

To deal with sometimes extreme shortages, the Ministry of Food instituted a system of rationing. To buy most rationed items, each person had to register at chosen shops and was provided with a ration book containing coupons. The shopkeeper was provided with enough food for registered customers. Purchasers had to present ration books when shopping so that the coupon or coupons could be cancelled as these pertained to rationed items. Rationed items had to be purchased and paid for as usual, although their price was strictly controlled by the government and many essential foodstuffs were subsidised; rationing restricted what items and what amount could be purchased as well as what they would cost. Items that were not rationed could be scarce. Prices of some unrationed items were also controlled; prices for many items not controlled were unaffordably high for most people.

During the Second World War rationing—not restricted to food—was part of a strategy including controlled prices, subsidies and government-enforced standards, with the goals of managing scarcity and prioritising the armed forces and essential services, and trying to make available to everyone an adequate and affordable supply of goods of acceptable quality.

First World War 1914–1918

In line with its business as usual policy during the First World War, the government was initially reluctant to try to control the food markets. It fought off attempts to introduce minimum prices in cereal production, though relenting in the area of control of essential imports (sugar, meat, and grains). When it did introduce changes, they were limited. In 1916, it became illegal to consume more than two courses while lunching in a public eating place or more than three for dinner; fines were introduced for members of the public found feeding the pigeons or stray animals.

In January 1917, Germany started unrestricted submarine warfare to try to starve Britain into submission. To meet this threat, voluntary rationing was introduced in February 1917. Bread was subsidised from September that year; prompted by local authorities taking matters into their own hands, compulsory rationing was introduced in stages between December 1917 and February 1918 as Britain's supply of wheat decreased to just six weeks' consumption. To help the process, ration books were introduced in July 1918 for butter, margarine, lard, meat, and sugar. Each consumer was tied to a retailer.  The basic ration of sugar, butter or margarine, tea, jam, bacon and meat came to about 1,680 calories.  It was adjusted for vegetarians, children and workers performing strenuous labour. Nutritional programmes for nursing mothers and young children were established by many local authorities.  Unlike most of Europe bread was not rationed. It was argued that the civilian population's health improved under rationing, though tuberculosis increased. During the war, average energy intake decreased by only 3%, but protein intake by 6%.  Controls were not fully released until 1921.

General strike of 1926 
The government made preparations to ration food in 1925, in advance of an expected general strike, and appointed Food Control Officers for each region. In the event, the trade unions of the London docks organised blockades by crowds, but convoys of lorries under military escort took the heart out of the strike, so that the measures did not have to be implemented.

Second World War 1939–1945

Emergency supplies for the 4 million people expected to be evacuated were delivered to destination centres by August 1939, and 50 million ration books were already printed and distributed.

When World War II began in September 1939, petrol was the first commodity to be controlled. On 8 January 1940, bacon, butter, and sugar were rationed. Meat, tea, jam, biscuits, breakfast cereals, cheese, eggs, lard, milk, canned and dried fruit were rationed subsequently, though not all at once. In June 1942, the Combined Food Board was set up by the United Kingdom and the United States to coordinate the world supply of food to the Allies, with special attention to flows from the U.S. and Canada to Britain. Almost all foods apart from vegetables and bread were rationed by August 1942. Strict rationing created a black market. Almost all controlled items were rationed by weight; but meat was rationed by price.

Fruits and vegetables

Fresh vegetables and fruit were not rationed, but supplies were limited. Some types of imported fruit all but disappeared. Lemons and bananas became unobtainable for most of the war; oranges continued to be sold, but greengrocers customarily reserved them for children and pregnant women. Apples were available from time to time.

Many grew their own vegetables, encouraged by the "Dig for Victory" campaign. In 1942, many young children, questioned about bananas, did not believe they were real. A popular music-hall song, written 20 years previously but sung ironically, was "Yes! We Have No Bananas".

Game

Game meat such as rabbit and pigeon was not rationed. Some British biologists ate laboratory rats.

Bread

Bread was not rationed until after the war ended, but the "national loaf" of wholemeal bread replaced the white variety. It was found to be mushy, grey and easy to blame for digestion problems. There were four permitted loaves and slicing and wrapping were not permitted. In May 1942, an order was passed that meals served in hotels and restaurants might not cost over five shillings per customer, might not be of more than three courses, and not more than one course might contain meat, fish or poultry. This was partly in response to increasing public concerns that "luxury" off-ration foodstuffs were being unfairly obtained by those who could afford to dine regularly in restaurants.

Fish

Fish was not rationed, but prices increased considerably as the war progressed. The government initially did not ration fish, for fishermen, at risk from enemy attack and mines, had to be paid a premium for their catch in order to fish at all. Prices were controlled from 1941. Like other foods, fish was seldom available in abundance. During the war, the Royal Navy requisitioned hundreds of trawlers for military use, leaving primarily smaller vessels thought less likely to be targeted by Axis forces to fish. Supplies eventually dropped to 30% of pre-war levels. Wartime fish and chips was often felt to be below standard because of the low-quality fat available for frying.

Honey

Due to the vital role beekeeping played in British agriculture and industry, special allotments of sugar were allowed for each hive. In 1943, the Ministry of Food announced that beekeepers would qualify for supplies of sugar not exceeding ten pounds per colony to keep their beehives going through the winter, and five pounds for spring feeding. Honey was not rationed, but its price was controlled - as with other unrationed, domestically produced produce, sellers imposed their own restrictions.

Alcohol

All drinks except beer were scarce. Beer was considered a vital foodstuff as it was a morale booster. Brewers were short of labour, and suffered from the scarcity of imported barley. A ban on importing sugar for brewing and racking made beer strengths weaker.

Clothing

As the war progressed, rationing was extended to other commodities such as clothing, which was rationed on a points system. When it was introduced, on 1 June 1941, no clothing coupons had been issued. At first, unused margarine coupons in ration books were valid for clothing. In the beginning, the allowance was enough for about one new outfit per year; as the war progressed, the points were reduced until buying a coat used almost a year's clothing coupons.

Fuel

On 13 March 1942 the abolition of the basic petrol ration was announced, effective from the 1 July (Ivor Novello, a prominent British public figure in the entertainment industry, was sent to prison for four weeks for misusing petrol coupons). Thenceforth, vehicle fuel was only available to official users, such as the emergency services, bus companies and farmers. The priority users of fuel were always the armed forces. Fuel supplied to approved users was dyed, and use of this fuel for non-essential purposes was an offence.

Subsidies

In addition to rationing and price controls, the government equalised the food supply through subsidies on items consumed by the poor and the working class. In 1942–43, £145 million was spent on food subsidies, including £35 million on bread, flour and oatmeal, £23 million on meat and the same on potatoes, £11 million on milk, and £13 million on eggs.<ref>{{cite book|title=Keesing's Contemporary Archives|volume=IV–V|date=June 1943|page=5,805}}</ref>

Restaurants
Restaurants were initially exempt from rationing but this was resented, as people with more money could supplement their food rations by eating out frequently. In May 1942, the Ministry of Food issued new restrictions on restaurants:
 Meals were limited to three courses; only one component dish could contain fish or game or poultry (but not more than one of these)
 In general, no meals could be served between 11:00 p.m. and 5:00 a.m. without a special licence
 The maximum price of a meal was 5 shillings. Extra charges allowed for cabaret shows and luxury hotels.

Public catering

About 2,000 new wartime establishments called British Restaurants were run by local authorities in schools and church halls. Here, a plain three-course meal cost only 9d and no ration coupons were required. They evolved from the London County Council's Londoners' Meals Service, which began as an emergency system for feeding people who had had their houses bombed and could no longer live in them. They were open to all and mostly served office and industrial workers.

Cooking depots were set up in Sheffield and Plymouth, providing roast dinners, stew and pudding.   Hot sweet tea was often distributed after bombing raids.

 Health effects 

In December 1939, Elsie Widdowson and Robert McCance of the University of Cambridge tested whether the United Kingdom could survive with only domestic food production if U-boats ended all imports. Two weeks of intensive outdoor exercise simulated the strenuous wartime physical work Britons would likely have to perform. The scientists found that the subjects' health and performance remained very good after three months; the only negative results were the increased time needed for meals to consume the necessary calories from bread and potatoes, and what they described as a "remarkable" increase in flatulence from the large amount of starch in the diet. The scientists also noted that their faeces had increased by 250% in volume.

The resultskept secret until after the wargave the government confidence that, if necessary, food could be distributed equally to all, including high-value war workers, without causing widespread health problems. Britons' actual wartime diet was never as severe as in the Cambridge study because imports from the United States avoided the U-boats, but rationing improved the health of British people; infant mortality declined and life expectancy rose, excluding deaths caused by hostilities. This was because it ensured that everyone had access to a varied diet with enough vitamins.  Blackcurrant syrup and later American bottled orange juice was provided free for children under 2, and those under 5 and expectant mothers got subsidised milk.  Consumption of fat and sugar declined while consumption of milk and fibre increased.

Standard rationing during the Second World War
The standard rations during the Second World War were as follows. Quantities are per week unless otherwise stated.

 Food rations 

 Army and Merchant Navy rations 

 

Offal and sausages were rationed only from 1942 to 1944. When sausages were not rationed, the meat needed to make them was so scarce that they often contained a high proportion of bread. Eggs were rationed and "allocated to ordinary [citizens] as available"; in 1944 thirty allocations of one egg each were made. Children and some invalids were allowed three a week; expectant mothers two on each allocation.
 1 egg per week or 1 packet (makes 12 ersatz eggs) of egg powder per month (vegetarians were allowed two eggs)
 plus, 24 points for four weeks for tinned and dried food.

Arrangements were made for vegetarians so that other goods were substituted for their rations of meat.

Each person received one tin of milk powder (equivalent to ) every eight weeks.

 Special civilian rations 
Persons falling within the following descriptions were allowed  of cheese a week in place of the general ration of :
 vegetarians (meat and bacon coupons must be surrendered)
 underground mine workers
 agricultural workers holding unemployment insurance books or cards bearing stamps marked "Agriculture"
 county roadmen
 forestry workers (including fellers and hauliers)
 land drainage workers (including Catchment Board workers)
 members of the Auxiliary Force of the Women's Land Army
 railway train crews (including crews of shunting engines but not including dining car staffs)
 railway signalmen and permanent way men who have no access to canteen facilities
 certain types of agricultural industry workers (workers employed on threshing machines, tractor workers who are not included in the Agricultural Unemployment Insurance Stamp Scheme, hay pressers and trussers).

 Weekly supplementary allowances of rationed foods for invalids 

 Non-food rations 
Clothing
Clothing rationing was announced on 1 June 1941. A major cause was the increased need for clothing materials to be utilised for producing uniforms. By this point in the war, one fourth of the population was wearing uniforms. Many of the female population who needed uniforms were part of the women's auxiliary forces. There were also a lot of volunteer services and organizations.  The materials to make tarpaulins and tyres were heavily affected by this rationing. It also became difficult for civilians to get shoes and boots.

Clothes rationing was implemented by the use of coupons required for purchases. The price had to be paid in money as usual, but additionally coupons had to be surrendered for each purchase. The system operated by "points" allocated to people: a certain number of points in coupons were required for each item. Clothing rationing points could be used for garments, and for wool, cotton and household textiles. Before rationing, lace and frills were popular on women's underwear, but these were soon banned so that material could be saved. Initially people were allocated 66 points for clothing per year; in 1942 it was cut to 48, in 1943 to 36, and in 1945-1946 to 24. The number of points required for a garment was determined by how much material and labour went into it. A dress could require eleven coupons, a pair of stockings two. Men's shoes required seven coupons, women' five. In 1945, an overcoat (wool and fully lined) was 18 coupons; a man's suit, 26–29 (according to lining). Children aged between 14 and 16 got 20 more coupons.

Garments of the same description but different quality would have different prices but require the same number of coupons; the more affordable clothing would often be less robust and wear out sooner even with repair. The prices of second-hand clothing and fur coats were fixed, but no points were required. People were allocated extra coupons for work clothes, such as overalls for factory work. Manual workers, civilian uniform wearers, diplomats, performers and new mothers also received extra coupons.

The civilian population was encouraged to repair and remake old clothes; pamphlets were produced by the Ministry of Information with the slogan "Make Do and Mend". Stockings, which were popularly worn by women before the war, were difficult to obtain, because the silk required to make them was needed to make parachutes. Many substituted by painting their legs and drawing a line at the back to give the appearance of stockings.

In 1942 clothing austerity measures—the Utility Clothing Scheme—were introduced, designed to offer a range of well-designed quality and price-controlled clothes affordable for all, which restricted the number of buttons, pockets and pleats (among other things) on clothes. The Utility scheme ended in 1952.

Clothes rationing ended on 15 March 1949.

Soap
All types of soap were rationed. Coupons were allotted by weight or (if liquid) by quantity. In 1945, the ration gave four coupons each month; babies and some workers and invalids were allowed more. A coupon would yield:
  bar hard soap
  bar toilet soap
  No. 1 liquid soap
  soft soap
  soap flakes
  powdered soap

Fuel
The Fuel and Lighting (Coal) Order 1941 came into force in January 1942. Central heating was prohibited "in the summer months". Some kinds of coal such as anthracite were not rationed, and in coal-mining areas waste coal was eagerly gathered, as it had been in the Great Depression.

Petrol
The coupons issued related to a car's calculated RAC horsepower and that horsepower's nominal fuel consumption. From July 1942 until June 1945, the basic ration was suspended completely, with essential-user coupons being issued only to those with official sanction.

Paper
Newspapers were limited from September 1939, at first to 60% of their pre-war consumption of newsprint. Paper supply came under the No 48 Paper Control Order, 4 September 1942, and was controlled by the Ministry of Production. By 1945, newspapers were limited to 25% of their pre-war consumption. Wrapping paper for most goods was prohibited.

The paper shortage often made it more difficult than usual for authors to get work published. In 1944, George Orwell wrote:

 Other products 
Whether rationed or not, many personal-use goods became difficult to obtain because of the shortage of components. Examples included razor blades, baby bottles, alarm clocks, frying pans and pots. Balloons and sugar for cakes for birthday parties were partially or completely unavailable. Couples had to use a mock cardboard and plaster wedding cake in lieu of a real tiered wedding cake, with a smaller cake hidden in the mock cake. Houseplants were impossible to get and people used carrot tops instead. Many fathers saved bits of wood to build toys for Christmas presents, and Christmas trees were almost impossible to obtain due to timber rationing.

 Post-Second World War 1945–1954 
On 8 May 1945, the Second World War ended in Europe, but rationing continued for several  years afterwards. Some aspects of rationing became stricter than they were during the war.  Bread was rationed from 21 July 1946 to 24 July 1948. Average body weight fell and potato consumption increased. Certain foodstuffs that the average 1940s British citizen would find unusual, for example whale meat and canned snoek fish from South Africa, were not rationed. Despite this, they did not prove popular. In 1950 4000 tonnes of whale meat went unsold on Tyneside. When sweets were taken off ration in April 1949 (but sugar was still rationed); understandably there was a rush on sweetshops, and rationing had to be reintroduced in August, remaining until 1953. At the time, this was presented as needed to feed people in European areas under British control, whose economies had been devastated by the fighting. This was partly true, but with many British men still mobilised in the armed forces, an austere economic climate, a centrally-planned economy under the post-war Labour government and the curtailment of American assistance (in particular, the closure of the Combined Food Board in 1946), resources were not available to expand food production and food imports. Frequent strikes by some workers (most critically dock workers) made things worse. A common ration book fraud was the ration books of the dead being kept and used by the living.

 Political reaction 
In the late 1940s, the Conservative Party utilised and encouraged growing public anger at rationing, scarcity, controls, austerity and government bureaucracy to rally middle-class supporters and build a political comeback that won the 1951 general election. Their appeal was especially effective to housewives, who faced more difficult shopping conditions after the war than during it.

 Timeline 

 1945 
Soap ration cut by an eighth, except for babies and young children. The referenced newspaper article predicted that households would be grossly hampered in making food items that included pastry.
 1 June: The basic petrol ration for civilians was restored.
 19 July: In order to preserve the egalitarian nature of rationing, gift food parcels from overseas weighing more than  would be deducted from the recipient's ration.

 1946 
 Summer: Continual rain ruined Britain's wheat crop. Bread and flour rationing started.

 1947 
 January–March: Winter of 1946–1947 in the United Kingdom: long hard frost and deep snow. Frost destroyed a huge amount of stored potatoes. Potato rationing started.
 Mid-year: A transport and dock strike, which among other effects caused much loss of imported meat left to rot on the docks, until the Army broke the strike. The basic petrol ration was stopped.

 1948 
 1 June: The Motor Spirit (Regulation) Act 1948 was passed, ordering a red dye to be to put into some petrol, and that red petrol was only allowed to be used in commercial vehicles. A private car driver could lose their driving licence for a year if red petrol was found in their car. A petrol station could be shut down if it sold red petrol to a private car driver. See List of Acts of the Parliament of the United Kingdom, 1940–1959: 1948.
 June: The basic petrol ration was restored, but only allowed about 90 miles per month.
 Bread came off ration.

1949 
 May 1949: Clothes rationing ended. According to one author, this was because attempts to enforce it were defeated by continual massive illegality (black market, unofficial trade in loose clothing coupons (many forged), bulk thefts of unissued clothes ration books).
 June, July and August 1949: The basic petrol ration was temporarily increased to allow about 180 miles per month.

1950 
 23 February 1950: 1950 general election fought largely on the issue of rationing. The Conservative Party campaigned on a manifesto of ending rationing as quickly as possible. The Labour Party argued for the continuation of rationing indefinitely. Labour was returned, but with its majority badly slashed to 5 seats.
 March 1950: The Ministry of Fuel and Power announced that the petrol ration would again be doubled for the months of June, July and August.
 April 1950: The Ministry of Fuel and Power announced that the petrol ration would be doubled for 12 months from 1 June.
 26 May 1950: Petrol rationing ended.

1951 
 25 October 1951: 1951 United Kingdom general election. The Conservatives came back into power.

1953 
 4 February 1953: Confectionery (sweets and chocolate) rationing ended."Immediately after the surprise announcement yesterday by the Minister of Food that sweets rationing "will end today", an Evening News reporter went out to buy himself half-pound box of chocolates." Sweets. All you want, and no bother. Shields Daily News. Thursday, 5 February 1953. Page 4, col. 4.
 September 1953: Sugar rationing ended.

1954 
 4 July 1954: Meat and all other food rationing ended in Britain.

Although rationing formally ended in 1954, cheese production was affected for decades afterwards. During rationing, most milk in Britain was used to make one kind of cheese, nicknamed Government Cheddar (not to be confused with the government cheese issued by the US welfare system). This wiped out nearly all other cheese production in the country, and some indigenous varieties of cheese almost disappeared. Later government controls on milk prices through the Milk Marketing Board continued to discourage production of other varieties of cheese until well into the 1980s, and it was only in the mid-1990s (following the effective abolition of the MMB) that the revival of the British cheese industry began in earnest.

1958 
 Coal rationing ends in July.

 Suez Crisis 1956–1957 
During the Suez Crisis, petrol rationing was briefly reintroduced and ran from 17 December 1956 until 14 May 1957. Advertising of petrol on the recently introduced ITV was banned for a period.

Oil crises of 1973 and 1979

Petrol coupons were issued for a short time as preparation for the possibility of petrol rationing during the 1973 oil crisis. The rationing never came about, in large part because increasing North Sea oil production allowed the UK to offset much of the lost imports. By the time of the 1979 energy crisis, the United Kingdom had become a net exporter of oil, so on that occasion the government did not even have to consider petrol rationing.

 See also 
 British cuisine
 List of renewable resources produced and traded by the United Kingdom
 Ration stamp
 Spiv
 Utility clothing
 Utility furniture
 Woolton pie

 References 

 Further reading 
 Beckett, Ian F. W. The Home Front 1914–1918: How Britain Survived the Great War (2006).
 Hammond, R. J. Food and agriculture in Britain, 1939–45: Aspects of wartime control (Food, agriculture, and World War II) (Stanford U.P. 1954); summary of his three volume official history entitled Food (1951–53)
 
 

 Zweiniger-Bargielowska, Ina. Austerity in Britain: Rationing, Controls & Consumption, 1939–1955 (2000) 286 pp. online
 Zweiniger-Bargielowska, Ina. "Rationing, austerity and the Conservative party recovery after 1945", Historical Journal'' (1994) 37#1 pp. 173–97  in JSTOR

External links 

 History in Focus: War – Rationing in Second World War London World War
 Information about clothes rationing
 Information about clothes rationing

Food politics
Public policy in the United Kingdom
Austerity in the United Kingdom (1939–1954)
United Kingdom home front during World War II